Jadu Zehi, also rendered as Jaddeh Zai or Jaddeh Zehi or Jado Zi or Jad Zai or Jadzi, may refer to:
 Jadu Zehi Buhir
 Jadu Zehi Hajji Piri